Bunny boots or Mickey Mouse boots (depending on the version) are the most common nicknames for the Extreme Cold Vapor Barrier Boots (Types I and II) used by the United States Armed Forces. These large, bulbous, waterproof rubber boots can be worn in extremely cold weather, with the liner-free interior retaining warmth by sandwiching up to one inch of wool and felt insulation between two vacuum-tight layers of rubber; this vacuum layer insulates the wearer's feet similar to a vacuum flask. These boots were originally developed at the Navy Clothing and Textile Research Center in Natick, Massachusetts, for use during the Korean War.

Originally designed during the Korean War for military expeditions in extremely cold weather (presently defined by the National Weather Service as ), the ECVB Boots are rated to either -20°F to -60°F (depending on the type) and have been sold to civilians in large numbers as military surplus.

Owing to their warmth and low price, these boots have become staple extreme cold weather gear both in civilian work and recreational environments. Bunny boots are common in arctic climates such as Alaska. 

The Original U.S. Army military bunny boots had leather uppers with double buckles, with felt lowers and hard leather soles that were very slippery on ice and snow. They came with felt boot liners.

Description

Type I
The black pairs, called Mickey Mouse boots (due to their oversized appearance resembling the feet of the eponymous cartoon mouse), weigh 44 oz. (1.25 kg) apiece, are rated for temperatures down to −20 °F (−28.9 °C)  and are made with oil/diesel resistant rubber. They are less common and predate the post-Korea white pairs ("bunny boots") which are still issued today.

Type II

Given the sufferings of the soldiers fighting in the Battle of Chosin Reservoir in Korea, inducing many cases of frostbite, even with Type I boots, the Type II was created to encompass the "worst case scenario" need to field soldiers in the coldest conditions in which any military force could reasonably attempt to conduct operations (including Alaska, Siberia and both Arctic poles). The boot is slightly bigger and heavier (~8 oz. (0.22 kg) more per boot) than the black Type I because of the extra insulation. These boots are manufactured by several companies including Bata, Acton and Air Boss.

Both Mickey Mouse boots and bunny boots have an air valve on each of the boots. These air valves must be opened prior to flying to ensure that the air pressure differential between the walls of the boot and the outside air does not cause the boots to rupture.

The extreme cold weather boot is nicknamed after the snowshoe hare, which is commonly found near Fort Greely, Alaska. During the fall the hares' fur changes color from brown to white, allowing it to blend in with its winter surroundings. As winter gets closer, more and more hares appear with their new white "boots".  

Both Mickey Mouse boots and bunny boots have rubber wedges on the front of the toe and the back of the heel. These wedges lock into military-standard ski and snowshoe bindings.

References

Cold War military equipment of the United States
Military boots